Paper Soldier is a 2008 Russian drama film directed by Aleksey German Jr. For his film, German received the Silver Lion Award from the Venice Film Festival.

Plot 
The film tells about the doctor Daniil Pokrovsky, who is preparing the squad of the first cosmonauts for spacewalk.

The title is a reference to a Russian song about a soldier who bravely steps into a fire, unaware that he's actually just a toy made of paper.

Reception
Slant Magazine said that the film "harkens back to Russian cinema of the ’60s" and gave it 3.5 of 4 stars. The review called Merab Ninidze's performance (as Doctor Daniil Pokrovsky) "mesmerizing" and the cinematography "exquisite" in a "tightly paced drama."

Cast 
 Merab Ninidze as Doctor Daniil Pokrovsky
 Chulpan Khamatova as Nina, Daniil's Wife
 Anastasiya Shevelyova as Vera
 Aleksandr Glebov as David
 Ruslan Ibragimov as Adrian Nikolayev
 Fyodor Lavrov as German Titov
 Polina Filonenko as Misha's Friend
 Valentin Kuznetsov as Yuri Gagarin
 Kirill Ulyanov as Garik
 Ramil Salakhutdinov as Misha

References

External links 
 

2008 films
2000s Russian-language films
Russian drama films
2008 drama films
Films directed by Aleksei Alekseivich German